"Upside Down" ("Bouncing off the Ceiling (Upside Down)" outside Europe) is a song by Swedish pop music group A-Teens, released as first single from their second album, Teen Spirit (2001). The song became the A-Teens' biggest hit to date, as well as their signature song.

A DVD single of the song was released in the United States in February 2001 to coincide with both the single's release and Teen Spirits release, and contains the music videos for both the title track and Mamma Mia from The ABBA Generation. The US CD single itself includes the title track, Super Trouper (also from The ABBA Generation) as a bonus song, the music video for the title track, and a collectible poster that features a calendar for the first six months of 2001.

Production and release
After the intense promotion in the United States in August 2000, the band went back to the studio to start working on their second album. The song was first announced at the Viva Music Awards in September 2000. The song was the first time the band released an original song and the song is not a cover, and the song was produced by the hit makers Grizzly and Tysper.

Music video
Directed by Patrick Kiely, the video was filmed in Universal Studios in Los Angeles from United States on 13–15 October 2000. It shows the band in an alternative world where everything is "upside down," and tells the story of one student who is in love with another student so much that they can't focus on their school studies; thus turning their lives "upside down." The dancing routine was choreographed by Wade Robson. The video reached number-one on several countdowns around the world. It was 2001's 25th most played video of MTV Mexico. The music video was uploaded on VEVO in November 2013 with 10 million views (as of 20 August 2019).

Commercial reception
The song became the A-Teens' biggest hit to date, as well as their signature song. The single reached Platinum on its 3rd week of release in their homeland, and by early 2001, "Upside Down" had peaked at number two and sold over 120,000 copies in Sweden, earning a 2× Platinum certification. The song became the band's biggest hit in the United Kingdom, selling 3,711 copies on its first day and peaking at number 10 by the end of the week. The song received 8/10 Stars on UK Yahoo Music Reviews. "Upside Down" had a name change in the United States and Canada to "Bouncing Off The Ceiling (Upside Down)". The song reached number 93 on the US Billboard Hot 100 while the physical single reached number 12 on the Billboard Hot 100 Single Sales Chart.

Track listings

Swedish and European CD single
 "Upside Down" (radio version) – 3:14
 "Upside Down" (sing-along version) – 3:14

European maxi-CD single
 "Upside Down" – 3:14
 "Upside Down" (Grizzly/Tysper radio remix) – 3:50
 "Upside Down" (Grizzly/Tysper extended remix) – 4:46
 "Upside Down" (JS16 Remix) – 6:34

UK CD single
 "Upside Down" (radio version) – 3:14
 "Upside Down" (Almighty 7-inch edit) – 4:18
 "Upside Down" (JS16 Remix) – 6:34
 "Upside Down" (karaoke version) – 3:14
 "Upside Down" (CD-ROM video)

UK cassette single
 "Upside Down" – 3:14
 "Mamma Mia" (radio version) – 3:14

US CD single
 "Bouncing Off the Ceiling (Upside Down)" – 3:14
 "Super Trouper" – 3:50
 "Bouncing Off the Ceiling (Upside Down)" (video)

US DVD single
 "Bouncing Off the Ceiling" (video)
 "Mamma Mia" (video)

Charts

Weekly charts

Year-end charts

Certifications and sales

Release history

References

External links
 

2000 singles
2000 songs
A-Teens songs
MCA Records singles
Songs written by Marcus Sepehrmanesh
Songs written by Tommy Tysper
Stockholm Records singles